Hank Wilson Vol. II is an album by singer and songwriter Leon Russell singing as Hank Wilson. The album was recorded in 1981 at Leon's Paradise Studios in Burbank, California. The album was produced by Leon Russell.

There were two vinyl LP released of this album, Hank Wilson Vol. II, one in 1982 and one in 1984. The two Hank Wilson Vol. II vinyl LP albums have different track listings and different cover photos. The 1982 has artwork of Russell with eyes closed and a microphone to his lips. The 1984 cover has him standing with his guitar. Hank Wilson Vol. II was re-released on CD on October 23, 2001.  The 1982 release was sold in limited quality at Russell's live shows.

Background
Leon Russell was born in Oklahoma, had a home in Tulsa, and grew up around country and blues music. After making successful rock albums, touring, and releasing the concert album Leon Live, he returned to his roots under the name of a fictional musical personality: Hank Wilson. The first Hank Wilson album called Hank Wilson's Back Vol. I was made by Leon Russell and some of his close friends from both Los Angeles and Nashville, and recorded the honky tonk songs between February 26 and February 28 in 1973.

Russell made a total of four Hank Wilson albums:
Hank Wilson's Back Vol. I (1973)
Hank Wilson, Vol. II  (1984)
Legend in My Time: Hank Wilson Vol. III (1998)
Rhythm & Bluegrass: Hank Wilson, Vol. 4 (2001)
In 2009 Leon released the album Best of Hank Wilson

Track listing 1982
All songs performed by Leon Russell, excluding A1.  All tracks composed by artist listed.
A1 	Wabash Cannonball : Vocals – Willie Nelson and Leon Russell 	2:43 
A2 	Oh Lonesome Me :   Written-By – Don Gibson 2:32
A3 	Tennessee Waltz :  Lyrics by Redd Stewart and music by Pee Wee King	2:30
A4 	Heartaches By The Number :    Written-By – Harlan Howard 2:44
A5 	If You've Got The Money Honey, I've Got The Time :    Written-By – Jim Beck, Lefty Frizzell 	2:19
A6 	Tumbling Tumbleweeds : Written-By – Bob Nolan	3:30
B1 	I'm Movin On :    Written-By – Clarence E. Snow 2:26
B2 	Waltz Across Texas :    Written-By – Talmadge Tubb	2:55
B3 	Don't Let The Stars Get In Your Eyes :   Written-By – Slim Willet 2:45
B4 	On The Wings Of A Dove :   Written-By – Bob Ferguson 3:02
B5 	I'll Be There :    Written-By – Ray Price and Rusty Gabbard	2:52
B6 	I Saw The Light :    Written-By – Hank Williams	2:21

Track listing 1984 release and 2001 CD 
All songs performed by Leon Russell.  All tracks composed by artist listed.
A1 	Oh Lonesome Me :   Written-By – Don Gibson 	2:27
A2 	Tennessee Waltz :  Lyrics by Redd Stewart and music by Pee Wee King	2:43
A3 	Heartaches By The Number :    Written-By – Harlan Howard	2:21
A4 	My Cricket Written By – Leon Russell 	3:03
A5 	If You've Got The Money Honey, I've Got The Time:     Written-By – Jim Beck, Lefty Frizzell	2:15
A6 	Tumbling Tumbleweeds :   Written-By – Bob Nolan	3:30
B1 	I'm Movin On :   Written-By – Clarence E. Snow	2:22
B2 	Waltz Across Texas :    Written-By – Talmadge Tubb	2:55
B3 	Don't Let The Stars Get In Your Eyes :   Written-By – Slim Willet 2:43
B4 	On The Wings Of A Dove :   Written-By – Bob Ferguson 3:03
B5 	I'll Be There Written-By : Ray Price and Rusty Gabbard 2:50
B6 	I Saw The Light :   Written-By – Hank Williams	 2:21

Personnel
Leon Russell -	Bass, Guitar, Keyboards, Piano, Primary Artist, Producer, Vocals
Wabash Cannonball Vocals – Willie Nelson
The Band: Trudy Fair, John "Juke" Logan, Billy West, Bob Britt, Jack Wessel, Shamsi Sarumi and Ambrose Campbell 
Artwork By – Robert Jones Designs
Photography By – Myrell Gilliam

References

External links

Leon Russell discography
Leon Russell lyrics
Leon Russell Records
Leon Russell NAMM Oral History Program Interview (2012)

1982 albums
1984 albums
Leon Russell albums
Albums produced by Leon Russell